Farmer Giles of Ham is a comic medieval fable written by J. R. R. Tolkien in 1937 and published in 1949. The story describes the encounters between Farmer Giles and a wily dragon named Chrysophylax, and how Giles manages to use these to rise from humble beginnings to rival the king of the land. It is cheerfully anachronistic and light-hearted, set in Britain in an imaginary period of the Dark Ages, and featuring mythical creatures, medieval knights, and primitive firearms. It is only tangentially connected with the author's Middle-earth legendarium:  both were originally intended as essays in "English mythology".

The book was originally illustrated by Pauline Baynes. The story has appeared with other works by Tolkien in omnibus editions, including The Tolkien Reader and Tales from the Perilous Realm.

Tolkien dedicated Farmer Giles of Ham to Cyril Hackett Wilkinson (1888–1960), a don he knew at Oxford University. Tolkien gives the reason for this dedication in a letter to the publisher, dated 5 July 1947:
[Farmer Giles of Ham] was, in fact, written to order, to be read to the Lovelace Society at Worcester College; and was read to them at a sitting.  For that reason I should like to put an inscription to C. H. Wilkinson on a fly-leaf, since it was Col. Wilkinson of that College who egged me to it ....

Plot summary

Farmer Giles (Ægidius Ahenobarbus Julius Agricola de Hammo, "Giles Redbeard Julius, Farmer of Ham") is not a hero. He is fat and red-bearded and enjoys a slow, comfortable life. But a rather deaf and short-sighted giant blunders on to his land, and Giles manages to ward him away with a blunderbuss shot in his general direction. The people of the village cheer: Farmer Giles has become a hero. His reputation spreads across the kingdom, and he is rewarded by the King with a sword named Caudimordax ("Tailbiter")—which turns out to be a powerful weapon against dragons.

The giant, on returning home, relates to his friends that there are no more knights in the Middle Kingdom, just stinging flies—actually the scrap metal shot from the blunderbuss—and this entices a dragon, Chrysophylax Dives, to investigate the area. The terrified neighbours all expect the accidental hero Farmer Giles to deal with him.

The story parodies the great dragon-slaying traditions. The knights sent by the King to pursue the dragon are useless fops, more intent on "precedence and etiquette" than on the huge dragon footprints littering the landscape. The only part of a 'dragon' they know is the annual celebratory dragon-tail cake. Giles by contrast clearly recognises the danger, and resents being sent with them to face it. But hapless farmers can be forced to become heroes, and Giles shrewdly makes the best of the situation.

It has been suggested that the Middle Kingdom is based on early Mercia, and that Giles's break-away realm (the Little Kingdom) is based on Frithuwald's Surrey.

Philological humour

Tolkien, by profession a philologist, sprinkled several philological jokes into the tale, including a variety of ingeniously fake etymologies. Almost all the place-names are supposed to occur relatively close to Oxford, along the Thames, or along the route to London. At the end of the story, Giles is made Lord of Tame, and Count of Worminghall. The village of Oakley, burnt to the ground by the dragon early in the story, may also be named after Oakley, Buckinghamshire, near to Thame.

Tolkien insists, tongue in cheek, that the village of Thame originally referred to the Tame Dragon housed in it, and that "tame with an h is a folly without warrant." Another joke puts a question concerning the definition of blunderbuss to "the four wise clerks of Oxenford" (a reference to Chaucer's Clerk; Tolkien had worked for Henry Bradley, one of the four main editors of the Oxford English Dictionary):
A short gun with a large bore firing many balls or slugs, and capable of doing execution within a limited range without exact aim. (Now superseded, in civilised countries, by other firearms.)
and then satirises it with application to the situation at hand:
However, Farmer Giles's blunderbuss had a wide mouth that opened like a horn, and it did not fire balls or slugs, but anything that he could spare to stuff in. And it did not do execution, because he seldom loaded it, and never let it off. The sight of it was usually enough for his purpose. And this country was not yet civilised, for the blunderbuss was not superseded: it was indeed the only kind of gun that there was, and rare at that. 

Tom Shippey comments: "Giles's blunderbuss ... defies the definition and works just the same." (Introduction to Tales from the Perilous Realm).

Characters

Chrysophylax Dives is a comically villainous dragon. He stands midway between Tolkien's Smaug, evil and greedy, and Kenneth Grahame's Reluctant Dragon, comical and timid. Chrysophylax comes across as a pompous aristocrat—rich, vain, and arrogant, but capable of compromise if handled correctly. Farmer Giles learns that he can be bullied, but is smart enough not to push him to desperation.

Caudimordax is the Latin name of "Tailbiter", the sword of Farmer Giles. The sword cannot be sheathed when a dragon comes within five miles of its bearer's presence. Four generations earlier, the sword belonged to Bellomarius, "the greatest of all the dragon-slayers" in the Middle Kingdom. Farmer Giles is granted this antiquated sword—by then become unfashionable—as a reward for driving off a giant from his fields with his blunderbuss. He later uses the sword to capture and control the dragon.

Garm is the talking dog. The dog is both vain and cowardly. His name is derived from the Norse mythological dog  Garmr.

References 

Giles of Ham
Books by J. R. R. Tolkien
1949 fantasy novels
British fantasy novels
British novellas
1937 fantasy novels
Novels set in the Middle Ages
Allen & Unwin books